In enzymology, a 2-hydroxyacylsphingosine 1-beta-galactosyltransferase is an enzyme that catalyzes the chemical reaction

UDP-galactose + 2-(2-hydroxyacyl)sphingosine  UDP + 1-(beta-D-galactosyl)-2-(2-hydroxyacyl)sphingosine

Thus, the two substrates of this enzyme are UDP-galactose and 2-(2-hydroxyacyl)sphingosine, whereas its two products are UDP and 1-(beta-D-galactosyl)-2-(2-hydroxyacyl)sphingosine.

This enzyme belongs to the family of glycosyltransferases, specifically the hexosyltransferases.  The systematic name of this enzyme class is UDP-galactose:2-(2-hydroxyacyl)sphingosine 1-beta-D-galactosyl-transferase. Other names in common use include galactoceramide synthase, uridine diphosphogalactose-2-hydroxyacylsphingosine, galactosyltransferase, UDPgalactose-2-hydroxyacylsphingosine galactosyltransferase, UDP-galactose:ceramide galactosyltransferase, and UDP-galactose:2-2-hydroxyacylsphingosine galactosyltransferase.

References

 
 

EC 2.4.1
Enzymes of unknown structure